Jaipur has several single screen theatres and multiplexes. Cinema is a popular form of entertainment for people and people have a special liking for Bollywood, and more recently Hollywood. The entertainment tax on cinema halls and multiplexes was eliminated in March 2011.

Single-screen theatres 
There are several prominent single-screen theatres in the city, although a number of them have been renovated, converted into multiplexes or shopping complexes.

Multiplexes 
A number of multiplexes have come up in Jaipur city. They screen both Bollywood and Hollywood movies.

References 

Culture of Jaipur
Jaipur
Buildings and structures in Jaipur
Cinemas